Peering.cz is an internet exchange point spread across 10 data centers in the Czech Republic, Slovakia, Austria and Germany, serving internet service providers, network operators and international content providers in Central Europe. Peering.cz was established in 2013 in Prague, Czech Republic. Peering.cz currently interconnects over 152 networks reaching maximum peak throughput of 1309 gigabits per second, making it one of the largest internet exchanges in Europe.

Network 
Peering.cz's 10 connection points.
 CE Colo Prague
 CE Colo DC7
 TTC Teleport Prague
 TTC DC2
 Sitel Bratislava
 DataCube Bratislava
 STU Bratislava
 Interxion Vienna
 Interxion Frankfurt
 Equinix Frankfurt

See also
 List of Internet exchange points

References

External links

Internet exchange points in the Czech Republic
Internet in the Czech Republic